The Mazharul Islam Poetry Award (Mazharul Islam Kabita Puroshkar), is given by the Bangla Academy of Bangladesh in recognition of creative genius in advancement and overall contribution in the field of Poetry. It was introduced in 2010 to honor the memory of Bangladeshi poet, folklorist, and academic Mazharul Islam.

Winners
 2010 – Abul Hussain
 2011 – Syed Shamsul Haq
 2012 – Shahid Qadri
 2013 – Belal Chowdhury
 2014 – Asad Chowdhury
 2015 – Mohammad Rafiq
 2016 – Abubakar Siddique
 2017 – Rubi Rahman
 2018 – Mohammad Nurul Huda
 2019 – Mahadev Saha

See also
 Bangla Academy Literary Award

References

External links
 Bangla Academy (official site)

Civil awards and decorations of Bangladesh
Bengali literary awards
Bangladeshi literary awards
Bangla Academy